The 1869 United States Senate election in Massachusetts was held on January 19, 1869. Incumbent Charles Sumner was re-elected to a fourth term in office.

At the time, Massachusetts elected United States senators by a majority vote of each separate house of the Massachusetts General Court: the House and the Senate.

Background
In the 1868 state legislative elections, Republicans maintained an overwhelming majority in both houses. Only 20 Democratic Representatives and two Democratic Senators were elected. This ensured Sumner's re-election in the January session, though there was some speculation that Sumner would vacate his seat to accept a Cabinet appointment in the newly elected Grant administration.

Election

Election in the House

Election in the Senate

References

1869
Massachusetts
United States Senate